Carrer de Roger de Llúria is a street in central Barcelona, in the Eixample district, named after Roger of Lauria. It starts in Carrer de Còrsega and ends in Plaça Urquinaona and is located between Carrer de Pau Claris and Carrer del Bruc, in Dreta de l'Eixample.

Buildings and sites of interest
 Cases Cerdà (1864) by Antoni Valls, Modernista buildings, among the oldest in Barcelona.
Jardins de la Torre de les Aigües
Passatge Permanyer, an alley where the musician Rafael Vidiella and the writer Apel·les Mestres lived.
Il·lustre Col·legi d'Advocats de Barcelona

Transport

Metro
 Urquinaona (L1, L4)

Bus
 Line 6 Pg. Manuel Girona - Poblenou
 Line 15 Hospital de Sant Pau - Collblanc
 Line 33 Zona Universitària - Verneda
 Line 34 Sarrià - Virrei Amat
 Line 39 Barceloneta - Horta
 Line 45 Pg. Marítim - Horta
 Line 47 Pl. Catalunya - Canyelles
 Line B20 Barcelona (Rda. Sant Pere) - Sta. Coloma (Oliveres)
 Line B21 Barcelona (Rda. Sant Pere) - Sta. Coloma (Av. Ramon Berenguer IV)
 Line B24 Barcelona (Rda. Sant Pere) - Badalona (H. Can Ruti)

See also
List of streets and squares in Eixample

External links
Cases Cerdà

Streets in Barcelona
Eixample